Victoria Jane Binns (born 27 August 1982) is an English actress, known for her two roles in the two veteran ITV soap operas Emmerdale and Coronation Street respectively. She had a lead role in Von Trapped opposite Caroline Quentin and also appeared in a couple of series of Children's Ward as a tomboy called Tash. In 1999 she played the role of Anne-Marie in the BBC drama series Nature Boy, directed by Joe Wright.

Career
Her theatre credits include:
Teechers and Perfect Pitch for Hull Truck Theatre company. 
Alfie, To Kill a Mockingbird, and The winters Tale Bolton Octagon
Singing in the Rain West End tour
Early Doors Live, Abigail's Party

Binns's first major TV role was in Nature Boy, alongside Lee Ingleby and Mark Benton, she then went on to join the ITV soap Emmerdale playing the part of Ollie Reynolds for four years from 1999 to 2003. In 2004 she played alongside Caroline Quentin in Comedy Drama Von Trapped after which Binns joined the cast of Coronation Street playing Molly Dobbs. In May 2010 Binns announced that she would be leaving Coronation Street Binns said "'It's been a joy to be involved in such a fantastic storyline and it is only right that it has the explosive ending viewers are waiting for. I am very excited about playing out the rest of this plot and indeed about what the future holds. I've had an amazing time in the show and feel it's right to leave on such a high."

On 9 December 2010, at the climax of a live episode of Coronation Street, her character Molly dies from injuries sustained in the tram crash to mark the show's 50th anniversary. Comforted by her ex-lover's wife Sally Webster (played by actress Sally Dynevor)

Binns is the voice of animation 'Susie Pugh' and has gone on to play a guest lead in Casualty for the BBC and True Crime for ITV and Moving On BBC. She appeared in both Series of hard hitting Period Drama The Mill for Channel 4. She has toured the hugely popular West End production of Singin' in the Rain, as antagonist Lina Lamont. Her other theatre credits include J.B. Priestley's I've been here before at the Jermyn Street Theatre; Hatched and Dispatched at The Park Theatre; To Kill a Mocking Bird directed by Elizabeth Newman; and The Winters Tale directed for the second time by David Thacker. Her latest Theatre role has seen her play the part of pub regular June in Early Doors alongside Craig Cash and Phil Mealey who also wrote the series.

Filmography

References

External links

1981 births
Living people
People from Tottington, Greater Manchester
English television actresses
English soap opera actresses
Actresses from Greater Manchester